KEFC-LP (100.5 FM) is a radio station  broadcasting a Christian contemporary radio format. Licensed to Turlock, California, United States. The station is currently owned by Crossroads Church of Turlock.

References

External links
 

EFC-LP
EFC-LP